Ulmus serotina Sarg., the September elm, is an autumn-flowering North American species of tree. It is uncommon beyond Tennessee; it is only very locally distributed through Illinois, Kentucky, Arkansas, Mississippi, Oklahoma, Alabama, and Georgia, and disjunct populations into Nuevo León, Mexico. It grows predominantly on limestone bluffs and along streams to elevations of 400 m.

Description
Rarely exceeding 20 m in height, the tree has a rounded crown with spreading to pendulous branches. The glabrous young shoots become progressively corky-winged with age, and bear oblong to obovate leaves <8 cm long. The wind-pollinated apetalous perfect flowers form pendulous racemes, which open in September and serve to distinguish the species from its cogenitor, the cedar elm U. crassifolia, with which it readily hybridizes. The samarae are oblong-elliptical, 10–15 mm in length, deeply divided at the apex, and ripen in November 
.

Pests and diseases
The species is highly susceptible to Dutch elm disease.

Cultivation
Before the outbreak of Dutch elm disease, U. serotina enjoyed limited popularity as a shade tree in the southern part of its range. The tree grows well on most soils, but is intolerant of anaerobic or saline conditions; it is also frost tolerant to -30°C (-23°F).  The September elm is very rare in cultivation in Europe; it was briefly propagated and marketed in the UK by the Hillier and Sons nursery, Winchester, Hampshire, from 1972 to 1977, when 16 were sold. It is not known to have been introduced to Australasia. No cultivars of this taxon are known, nor is it known to be in commerce.

Notable trees
The US national champion, measuring 25.5 m high in 2007, grows in Davidson County, Tennessee.

Hybrids
 Ulmus × arkansana

Accessions
North America
Mildred E. Mathias Botanical Garden, UCLA, Los Angeles, California, US. (No details available)
Morton Arboretum, US. Acc. no. 1039-23.
U S National Arboretum , Washington, D.C., US. Acc. no. 55431.
Europe
Grange Farm Arboretum, Sutton St James, Spalding, Lincolnshire, UK. Acc. no. not known.
Royal Botanic Garden Edinburgh, UK. Acc. no. 20080091, from seed wild collected in USA.
Royal Botanic Gardens, Kew, UK. Acc. no. not known.
Royal Botanic Gardens, Wakehurst Place, UK. Acc. no. 2006-143.
Sir Harold Hillier Gardens, UK. Acc. no. 2004.1059, 3 trees, collected in Tennessee, 2004.
Thenford House arboretum, Banbury, UK. No details available.
University of Copenhagen, Botanic Garden, Denmark. No details available.

References

External links

serotina
Trees of the Southeastern United States
Trees of the Southern United States
Flora of Nuevo León
Ulmus articles with images
Elm species and varieties